The Australian Certificate of Identity (COI) is a biometric travel document issued by the Department of Foreign Affairs and Trade to individuals who are not Australian citizens and are about to leave Australia or one of its territories.

It should not be confused with the Document of Identity, which conversely is intended mainly for use by Australian citizens in circumstances where it would be unnecessary or undesirable to issue a passport.

Eligibility

A person in one of the following can apply for a COI:
 Stateless person
 Person in Australia on a protection Class BA subclass 202 Global Special Humanitarian or Special Assistance Category 208 to 217 visas
 Holder of a Resolution of Status (RoS) visa (Class CD) subclass 851 who previously held a non-refugee visa
 Voluntary or non-voluntary returnee
 A non-Australian/non-British citizen in Australia whose government does not have a presence in Australia but who has an urgent need to travel for compassionate circumstances and who can show that their government cannot provide a travel document in time to meet their travel needs.

Use
Holders of a COI who are refugees or stateless persons and legally resident in Australia can enter Germany, Hungary and Slovenia visa-free. Holders of a COI who are refugees (but not stateless persons) legally resident in Australia can enter Slovakia visa-free. The maximum length of stay under these visa exemptions is 90 days in a 180-day period.

See also
Australian Convention Travel Document
 Australian Document of Identity
Australian passport

References

External links
Department of Foreign Affairs and Trade: Travel related documents

International travel documents
Identity documents of Australia